Tammy Graham is the only studio album by American country music artist Tammy Graham. It was released on April 29, 1997 via Career Records, a division of Arista Nashville. The album produced the singles "Tell Me Again", "A Dozen Red Roses" and "Cool Water".

Critical reception
The album was met with mixed reviews. Jeffrey B. Remz of Country Standard Time compared her vocals to those of Wynonna Judd and Trisha Yearwood, but said that besides "Cool Water," the album was "middle of the road." New Country magazine gave it one-and-a-half stars out of five, with Brian Mansfield criticizing Graham for singing "straight over the top" on every song.

Track listing

Personnel
Compiled from liner notes.

Musicians
 Eddie Bayers — drums
 Barry Beckett — keyboards
 Paul Franklin — steel guitar
 Terry McMillan — percussion
 Phil Naish — keyboards
 Bobby Ogdin — keyboards
 Don Potter — acoustic guitar
 Michael Rhodes — bass guitar
 Brent Rowan — electric guitar
 John Wesley Ryles — background vocals
 Joe Spivey — fiddle
 Harry Stinson — background vocals
 Dennis Wilson — background vocals
 Curtis "Mr. Harmony" Young — background vocals

Production
 Barry Beckett — producer
 Pete Greene — recording
 Brian K. Lee — mastering
 Czaba Petocz — recording

Chart performance

Album

References

1997 debut albums
Albums produced by Barry Beckett
Arista Records albums
Tammy Graham albums